Kidnapping in South Africa is a common crime in the country, with over 4,100 in the 2013/2014 period, and a child going missing every five hours.

The 1966 kidnapping for ransom of Etty Glazer for R140,000 was 4 times the ransom paid in the Lindbergh kidnapping and was the highest paid ransom demand in the world at the time.

Walter da Silva a Brazilian professional footballer was kidnapped by dissatisfied soccer fans in an attempt to alter the outcome of a 1999 Premier Soccer League clash. He was the coach of Moroka Swallows F.C. at the time. The Kidnappers ordered him to phone two of his technical assistants and tell them to leave the match.

In 2004 Benedict Cumberbatch and two friends were kidnapped by 6 armed men near St Lucia, KwaZulu-Natal. Benedict only spoke publicly about it in July 2009 at an interview for a book launched by the Prince's Trust and Starbucks.

On 16 March 2015, 48-year-old Chen Lin, was kidnapped for ransom by four armed men in front of his Kokstad apartment gate. They took him to a property near Bizana, some 80 km away. They contacted his wife, using his phone, and demanded a R2,000,000 (2 Million Rand) ransom. The next day two of the kidnappers left to purchase food in the nearby town. While away, the two remaining kidnappers apparently snorted cocaine, and sometime later fell asleep. At this time Mr Lin managed to free himself, and escape; a passing motorist picked him up and took him to hospital.

Notable cases

References